Wab is an Austronesian language spoken by about 120 people in the coastal villages of Wab and Saui, Madang Province, Papua New Guinea.

References

Bel languages
Languages of Madang Province
Vulnerable languages